Sioe Gouw Pau (born 15 May 1935) is an Indonesian fencer. She competed in the women's individual foil event at the 1960 Summer Olympics.

References

External links
 

1935 births
Living people
Indonesian female foil fencers
Olympic fencers of Indonesia
Fencers at the 1960 Summer Olympics
Sportspeople from Bandung
20th-century Indonesian women